Peter King, 1st Baron King,  (c. 1669 – 22 July 1734), commonly referred to as Lord King, was an English lawyer and politician, who became Lord High Chancellor of Great Britain.

Life
King was born in Exeter in 1669, and educated at Exeter Grammar School.
In his youth he was interested in early church history, and published anonymously in 1691 An Enquiry into the Constitution, Discipline, Unity and Worship of the Primitive Church that flourished within the first Three Hundred Years after Christ. This treatise engaged the interest of his cousin, John Locke, the philosopher, by whose advice his father sent him to the Leiden University, where he stayed for nearly three years. He entered the Middle Temple in 1694 and was called to the bar in 1698.

In 1700 he was returned to Parliament of England as the member for Bere Alston in Devon, holding the seat until 1715.

He was appointed recorder of Glastonbury in 1705 and recorder of London in 1708. Made a Serjeant-at-Law, he was appointed Chief Justice of the Common Pleas from 1714 to 1725, when he was raised to the peerage as a Lord Justice and Speaker of the House of Lords. In June of the same year he was made Lord High Chancellor of Great Britain, holding office until compelled by a paralytic stroke to resign in 1733.

He was admitted a Fellow of the Royal Society on 14 November 1728.

He died at Ockham, Surrey, on 22 July 1734.

Assessment

Lord King as chancellor failed to sustain the reputation which he had acquired at the common law bar. Nevertheless, he left his mark on English law by establishing the principles that a will of immovable property is governed by the lex loci rei sitae, and that where a husband had a legal right to the personal estate of his wife, which must be asserted by a suit in equity, the court would not help him unless he made a provision out of the property for the wife, if she required it. He was also the author of the Act (4 Geo. II. c. 26) by virtue of which English superseded Latin as the language of the courts.

Family
King married Anne Seys in 1704. They had six children: two daughters and four sons. Each of their sons succeeded in turn as Lord King, Baron of Ockham.

After his death in 1734, the widowed Lady King lived in Grosvenor Square until her death in 1767.

In 1835 his great-great-grandson William King (1805–1893), married Ada Byron, the only daughter of Lord Byron and was later created Earl of Lovelace. Another descendant Peter John Locke King was a Member of Parliament for Surrey from 1847 to 1849 and won some fame as an advocate of reform, being responsible for the passing of the Real Estate Charges Act 1854, and for the repeal of a large number of obsolete laws.

Works
Lord King published in 1702 a History of the Apostles' Creed (Leipzig, 1706; Basel, 1750) which went through several editions and was also translated into Latin. His earlier work An Enquiry into the Constitution, Discipline, Unity and Worship of the Primitive Church that flourished within the first Three Hundred Years after Christ was published 1691 and was quoted by John Wesley in many of his correspondences and is seen as influencing many of his view on the order of the Church.

Cases

Some notable cases on which he was involved:
R v Woodburne and Coke
Keech v Sandford (1726) Sel Cas Ch 61
Coppin v Coppin (1725) - a will settling land in England must conform to the rules of English law, even when made abroad
Croft v Pyke (1733) - a partner's joint estate is liable first to the debts of the partnership, before payment of legacies to heirs
Milner v Colmer (1731)
Brown et Uxor v Elton (1733) - the practice of the court was to compel a husband to make a settlement on the wife before recovering his wife's portion by equity
Spoke in support of the second article brought against Dr.Sacheverell, February 28, 1709/10 - 'Tryal of Dr.Sacheverell' printed London 1710

References

Attribution

1669 births
1734 deaths
People educated at Exeter School
Members of the Middle Temple
Serjeants-at-law (England)
Chief Justices of the Common Pleas
Lord chancellors of Great Britain
Lord High Stewards
Members of the Privy Council of Great Britain
Peter 1
English MPs 1701
English MPs 1701–1702
English MPs 1702–1705
English MPs 1705–1707
Members of the Parliament of Great Britain for Bere Alston
British MPs 1707–1708
British MPs 1708–1710
British MPs 1710–1713
British MPs 1713–1715
Fellows of the Royal Society
Members of the Parliament of England for Bere Alston